Situ or situs may refer to:

Latin
 In situ, Latin phrase meaning on-site or in-place
 Situs (law), a legal term meaning "site" where a law applies
 In biology, situs refers to the disposition of organs in organisms with left-right asymmetry
 Situs solitus, the normal position of organs
 Situs inversus, the inverted disposition of organs
 Situs ambiguus (heterotaxia), comprises mixed cases where only some organs are inverted

Chinese
 Situ (office), a high-ranking government position in ancient China
 Situ (surname), a surname derived from the office, also romanised Szeto, Seto, or Soohoo
 Situ language, spoken in Sichuan, China

Tibetan
 Situ Panchen (1700–1774), 8th Tai Situ Rinpoche, an influential Tibetan